Peter Lloyd is an Australian former professional tennis player.

Lloyd grew up in Canberra and was one of two players from the ACT, along with Steve Maloney, to take up a scholarship in 1978 to attend the University of Georgia. He played collegiate tennis at Georgia for four years and was an All-SEC selection in 1980.

On the professional tour, Lloyd had a best singles world ranking of 339 and featured in the qualifying draw for the 1987 Wimbledon Championships. In 1995 he made his only career ATP Tour main draw appearance as a doubles wildcard pairing with Dan Granot at the AT&T Challenge in Atlanta.

References

External links
 
 

Year of birth missing (living people)
Living people
Australian male tennis players
Georgia Bulldogs tennis players
Tennis people from the Australian Capital Territory
20th-century Australian people